Jia Qiyun (1914–2004) was a People's Republic of China politician. He was born in Shanxi Province. He served as the director of National Bureau of Statistics of the People's Republic of China from November 1958 to June 1961. He was Communist Party of China Committee Secretary of Guizhou Province and Communist Party Secretary and Governor of Yunnan Province.

1914 births
2004 deaths
People's Republic of China politicians from Shanxi
Chinese Communist Party politicians from Shanxi
Governors of Yunnan
Politicians from Yuncheng